Nayapala  (ruled 1038–1055) is the name of  twelfth ruler of the Pala dynasty of eastern Indian Subcontinent, mainly the Bengal and Bihar regions.
Nayapala, the son of Mahipala I, defeated the Kalachuri king Karna after a long struggle. The two later signed a peace treaty at the mediation of the Buddhist scholar Atiśa.

See also
 List of rulers of Bengal

References

Pala kings
1055 deaths
Year of birth unknown